Kingsland railway station was a station in Kingsland, Herefordshire, England. The station was opened in 1856, closed to passengers in 1955 and closed completely in 1964.

The station was located south of the village, on the A4110, just north of the Pinsley Brook.

References

Further reading

Disused railway stations in Herefordshire
Railway stations in Great Britain opened in 1856
Railway stations in Great Britain closed in 1955
Former Great Western Railway stations